The San Diego Country Club is a private golf club in Chula Vista, California. The club, which features an 18-hole golf course with a par of 72, was founded in 1897.

In addition to a golf course, the club also organizes special events such as weddings, graduation parties and birthdays. The country club also hosts business meetings.

The golf course was designed in 1921 by the golf course architect Willie Watson and remodeled by William Francis Bell (Billy Bell Jr.) to add additional length and bunkering.

History 

In 1897, the Club's first facility of 9 holes was built in Balboa Park. It was enlarged in 1898 to accommodate and keep the changing rooms of female and male club members separate. However, in 1914 the club was evicted to make way for construction necessary for the 1915 Pan-American Exposition. Later, the club was merged with Point Loma Golf Club located in Loma Portal, the area close to the present-day San Diego airport.

In 1920, more than 150 acres was purchased in Chula Vista. On September 3, 1921, the golf course, designed by William Watson, was officially opened.

The Farmers Insurance Open of the PGA Tour began at the club in 1952 as the 'San Diego Open.

Golf tournaments 
 1952–1953 San Diego Open (PGA Tour)
 1964 U.S. Women's Open
 1993, 2017 United States Women's Amateur Golf Championship
 2002, 2007 Pacific Coast Amateur 
 2013 SCGA Amateur Championship
 Lamkin Intercollegiate 2008–2018
 2022 Southern California Golf Association Amateur

See also 
 San Diego Golf Academy

References

External links 
 Official website
 Historian Dean Knuth's account of William Watson's Design Career

Golf clubs and courses in California
Chula Vista, California
Sports venues completed in 1921
1921 establishments in California